Ollie Johnson (born May 11, 1949) is an American former professional basketball player.

A 6'6" forward from Temple University, Johnson played ten seasons (1972–1982) in the National Basketball Association as a member of the Portland Trail Blazers, New Orleans Jazz, Kansas City Kings, Atlanta Hawks, Chicago Bulls, and Philadelphia 76ers.  He averaged 7.7 points per game in his NBA career.

He became director of athletics at the Community College of Philadelphia, retiring in 2011.

Notes

1949 births
Living people
African-American basketball players
American expatriate basketball people in Australia
American expatriate basketball people in Belgium
American men's basketball players
Atlanta Hawks players
Chicago Bulls players
Hobart Devils players
Junior college athletic directors in the United States
Kansas City Kings players
New Orleans Jazz expansion draft picks
New Orleans Jazz players
Philadelphia 76ers players
Portland Trail Blazers draft picks
Portland Trail Blazers players
Small forwards
Temple Owls men's basketball players
Basketball players from Philadelphia
21st-century African-American people
20th-century African-American sportspeople